Gamarra Menor in Spanish or Gamarra Gutxia in Basque is a village in Álava, Basque Country, Spain. 

Populated places in Álava